Rodeneck is a comune (municipality) in South Tyrol in northern Italy.

Geography
Rodeneck borders the following municipalities: Kiens, Lüsen, Mühlbach, Natz-Schabs, St. Lorenzen and Vintl. In Rodeneck there are 7 municipal fractions: Vill, the largest and most populous fraction of the municipality, Nauders, Gifen, St. Pauls, Spisses, Ahnerberg and Fröllerberg, the municipal fraction with the fewest inhabitants

History

Origin
The presence of non-local flint and quartz fragments suggests that the area was inhabited by hunters during the middle Stone Age (5000 BC). The discovery of middle Bronze Age forts dates permanent settlement to at least 1500 BC.

The community was mentioned by name for the first time in the Actum Rotungun of 1050 AD as a place that made donations to the bishop. In the following centuries, the name has appeared in a variety of forms. Between 1140 and 1147 Bishop Hartmann of Brixen made the town an alod and bestowed it upon his ministerialis Frederick II and his wife Gerbirg, who built a castle there.

At the start of the 19th century Rodeneck became an independent municipality, administered from 1822 by its own mayor. In 1926, the municipality lost its autonomy and became part of the municipality of Mühlbach, and then winning back its independence in 1955 after a long struggle.

Coat-of-arms
The emblem is azure a chevron argent. It is the insignia of the Lords of Rodank who built the Rodenegg Castle in 1140. The coat of arms was granted in 1969.

Society

Linguistic distribution
According to the 2011 census, 99.65% of the population speak German, 0.26% Italian and 0.09% Ladin as first language.

References

Bibliography
 Freed, John B. (1995). Noble Bondsmen: Ministerial Marriages in the Archdiocese of Salzburg, 1100–1343. (Ithaca, NY: Cornell University Press).

External links
Official website 

Municipalities of South Tyrol